English rock duo Royal Blood have released three studio albums, two extended plays (EPs), fourteen singles and nineteen music videos. Formed in Brighton in March 2011, Royal Blood consists of bassist and vocalist Mike Kerr and drummer Ben Thatcher. After signing with Warner Bros. Records, the duo released their debut single "Out of the Black" in October 2013, which debuted at number 29 on the UK Rock & Metal Singles Chart. In February 2014, "Little Monster" was issued as the band's second single, registering on the UK Singles Chart at number 95 and the UK Rock & Metal Singles Chart at number one. Both singles were later issued alongside their B-sides on the EP Out of the Black in March. "Come On Over" – initially featured as the B-side to "Out of the Black" – was released as a single in April, reaching number 68 on the UK Singles Chart. At the same time, "Little Monster" also returned to the charts, peaking at number 74 on the UK Singles Chart.

Royal Blood's self-titled debut album was released in August 2014, topping the UK Albums Chart, Irish Albums Chart and Scottish Albums Chart. The week before the album's release, "Out of the Black" registered on the UK Singles Chart at number 78, while the band's fourth single "Figure It Out" debuted at number 50 (it would later peak at number 43). Royal Blood was certified gold by the British Phonographic Industry (BPI) by September, and eventually received a platinum certification for sales in excess of 300,000 units. "Ten Tonne Skeleton" was released as the fifth and final single from Royal Blood in late 2014; it charted in Canada only, reaching number 45 on the Canadian Rock Songs chart. "Where Are You Now?", featured on the TV series Vinyl, also registered on the chart, peaking at number 43.

In April 2017, it was announced that Royal Blood's second album How Did We Get So Dark? would be released in June. "Lights Out" was issued as the first single from the album the same month, debuting at number 96 on the UK Singles Chart and number one on the UK Rock & Metal Singles Chart. How Did We Get So Dark? debuted atop the UK Albums Chart upon its release, while a total of ten tracks from the album reached the top 20 of the UK Rock & Metal Singles Chart.

The band officially announced their third studio album Typhoons on 21 January 2021, with a planned release date for 30 April 2021. The band released three singles from Typhoons preceding the album's release: "Trouble's Coming", "Typhoons", and "Limbo".

Studio albums

Extended plays

Singles

Featured singles

Other charted songs

Music videos

Footnotes

References

External links
Royal Blood official website
Royal Blood discography at AllMusic
Royal Blood discography at Discogs
Royal Blood discography at MusicBrainz

Royal Blood
Royal Blood